Tony Matelli (born 1971) is an American sculptor perhaps best known for his work Sleepwalker.

Born in Chicago, Matelli received his BFA from the Milwaukee Institute of Art & Design in 1993 and his MFA from the Cranbrook Academy of Art in 1995. 
He lives and works in New York City.

In 2017 Matelli created the sculpture "Hera" for and exhibited the work at the Aldrich Museum of Contemporary Art in Ridgefield, Connecticut as part of their "Main Street Sculpture" series.

Incorporating figurative, botanical, and abstract forms in his sculpture, Tony Matelli creates uncanny objects that are both unsettling and comical. His bronze sculptures feature ropes frozen in mid-air, as if the ropes were dropped on a plinth and cast just before collapsing into inert coils. Other works rely on unusual juxtapositions, such as his weeds series in which plants sprout from the space between gallery walls and floors. Across his oeuvre, and particularly in his mirror paintings, Matelli discards traditional genre categories in favor of experiential concerns. “I like sculpture because it’s unwieldy, and there is a resistance to decoration in sculpture that I like,” Matelli has said. “Genres are at the service of ideas, not the other way around.”

Sleepwalker 
Most of the sculptor's notoriety has arisen from his work Sleepwalker and the placement of the work therein. First publicly installed outside Wellesley College - an all women's school - the sculpture came under attack both in words and deed.  Some students reaction to the work which was first created for display at the institute of higher learning in time with his solo exhibition at Wellesley's Davis Museum, titled "New Gravity" was similar to that of some people's to Anthony Gormley's figure placed near a ledge on the Empire State Building being called in to emergency services as a jumper; they thought it was a stumbling invasive drunk or otherwise a perpetrator.  A petition was then started to demand removal of the work and, as reported by the New York Times, garnered over five hundred signatures, with the organizers stating that it had become “a source of apprehension, fear, and triggering thoughts regarding sexual assault for some members of our campus community.” Matelli responded stating.."If you have bad feelings toward this and it’s triggering you, you need to seek sympathy, you need to seek help....”.  In 2014 the sculpture was vandalized  by spraying yellow paint on it. In the end the sculpture stayed for the course of the exhibition and the boisterous debate continued online, ending in over one thousand signatures asking for the work's removal on change.org.

Little known, the media coverage of the Sleepwalker at Wellesley started via a local blog, The Swellesley Report, got picked up in Boston media, and then was communicated via wire services. Over several waves of the developing controversy, over 5000 articles in over 96 countries, in multiple languages, were identified. The media reaction was completely unanticipated by the artist, the media relations officer, and the museum.

During the spring and summer of 2016 the sculpture was exhibited along New York City's Highline Park with continued debate and the great interest of onlookers who group around it sometimes in crowds.

Solo exhibitions 

2020

Abandon, Andréhn-Schiptjenko, Paris, France

2019

Andréhn-Schiptjenko, Stockholm, Sweden

2018

Lapses, Pilevneli Gallery, Istanbul, Turkey

Real Estate Fine Art, Brooklyn, NY

I Hope All Is Well..., 500 Capp Street, San Francisco, CA

2017

Past-Life, Marlborough Contemporary, London, United Kingdom

Garden, The Aldrich Contemporary Art Museum, Ridgefield, CT (cat.)

2016

Realisms, The State Hermitage Museum, St. Petersburg, Russia (cat.)

2015

Garden, Marlborough Chelsea, New York, New York

Garden, Marlborough Chelsea, Broome St, New York, New York

2014

Tony Matelli, Olaf Bruening, John Miller, Gary Tatintsian Gallery Inc., Moscow, Russia (cat.)

Tony Matelli: New Gravity, The Davis Museum, Wellesley College, Massachusetts (cat.)

2013

Stephane Simoens Contemporary, Knokke, Belgium

White Flag Projects, Saint Louis, Missouri  (cat.)

Tony Matelli – A HUMAN ECHO, Bergen Kunstmuseum, Bergen, Norway (cat.)

Windows, Walls and Mirrors, Green Gallery, Milwaukee, Wisconsin

2012

Echoes, Andréhn-Schiptjenko, Stockholm, Sweden

Tony Matelli - A HUMAN ECHO, ARoS Aarhus Kunstmuseum, Aarhus, Denmark (cat.)

Windows, Walls and Mirrors, Leo Koenig Inc, New York, New York

2011

Falkenrot Prize 2011: Tony Matelli: Glass of Water, Kunstlerhaus Bethanien, Berlin (cat.)

Glass of Water, Selestat Bienniale, Selestat, France

2010

The Constant Now, Andrehn-Schiptjenko, Stockholm Sweden

Tony Matelli: Mirror Paintings, Andrehn-Schiptjenko, Stockholm

Mise en Abyme, Stephane Simoens Contemporary, Knokke, Belgium

2009

Yesterday, Green Gallery, Milwaukee, Wisconsin

The Idiot, Gary Tatintsian Gallery Inc., Moscow, Russia

Life and Times, Galerie Charlotte Moser, Geneva, Switzerland

Abandon, Palais de Tokyo, Paris, France

2008

Survival, Gary Tatintsian Gallery, Inc., Moscow, Russia (cat.)

Survival, Uppsala Kunstmuseum, Uppsala, Sweden (cat.)

The Old Me, Leo Koenig Inc, New York, New York

Self Portraits, with Phillip Akkerman, Stephane Simoens, Knokke, Belgium

2007

New Works, Leo Koenig Inc, New York, New York

2006

Andrehn-Schiptjenko, Stockholm, Sweden

Charlotte Moser Gallery, Geneva, Switzerland

2005

Emmanuel Perrotin Gallery, Paris, France

Abandon, Centre d’Arte Santa Monica, Barcelona, Spain

2004

Abandon, Kunsthalle Wien, Vienna, Austria (cat.)

Fucked and The Oracle, Kunstraum Dornbirn, Dornbirn, Austria (cat.)

2003

Andrehn-Schiptjenko, Stockholm, Sweden

Sies & Hoeke Gallery, Dusseldorf, Germany

2002

Emmanuel Perrotin Gallery, Paris, France

Gian Enzo Sperone, Rome

Sperone Jr., Rome, Italy

Bailey Fine Art, Toronto

2001

Leo Koenig Inc., New York, NY

Art Dealers Invitational, Marseilles, France

2000

Sies+ Hoeke Gallery, Dusseldorf, Germany

Ten in One Gallery, New York, NY

Torch Gallery, Amsterdam, Holland

Gallery du Triangle, Bordeaux, France

1999

Abandon, University of Buffalo Art Gallery, New York, NY (cat.)

Andrehn Schiptjenko, Stockholm, Sweden

Basilico Fine Arts, New York, NY

1997

Basilico Fine Arts, New York, NY

Ten in One Gallery, Chicago, IL

Fellowships 
1999 New York Foundation for the Arts, Fellowship in Sculpture

Education 
1995 M.F.A., Cranbrook Academy of Art, Michigan

1993 B.F.A., Milwaukee Institute of Art & Design, Wisconsin

1991 Alliance of Independent Colleges of Art-Independent Study, New York

Public collections 

ARoS Aarhus Kunstmuseum, Aarhus, Denmark

ARKEN Museum of Modern Art, Ishøj, Denmark

Akzo Nobel Art Foundation

Bergen Kunstmuseum, Bergen, Norway

Bonnier Collection, Stockholm, Sweden

CCA Andratx, Majorca, Spain

Cranbrook Art Museum, Cranbrook, MI

CURIOUSLY STRONG Altoids Collection, (New Museum) New York, NY

The Cultural Foundation Ekaterina, Moscow, Russia

The Davis Museum, Wellesley, MA

FLAG Art Foundation, New York, NY

Fundacion La Caixa Madrid, Spain

FRAC Bordeaux, France

Magasin 3 Stockholm Konsthall, Stockholm, Sweden

MIT List Visual Arts Center, Cambridge, MA

Mudam Luxembourg, Luxembourg

Musee d’arte Contemporain Montreal, Canada

Museum Ludwig, Cologne, Germany

Museum of New Zealand Te Papa Tongarewa, Wellington, New Zealand

Museum Voorlinden, Wassenaar, Netherlands

Philbrook Museum of Art, Tulsa, OK

State National Centre of Contemporary Art, Moscow, Russia

Skive New Art Museum SNYK, Copenhagen, Denmark

Sundsvalls Kommun, Sundsvall, Sweden

Uppsala Konstmusuem, Uppsala, Sweden

References 

Living people
American male sculptors
1971 births
Artists from Chicago
Sculptors from Illinois
20th-century American sculptors
20th-century American male artists
21st-century American sculptors
21st-century American male artists
Cranbrook Academy of Art alumni